Mandrill is the debut album by the Brooklyn, New York-based band Mandrill, released in April 1971. The album peaked at number twenty-seven on the Billboard R&B albums chart.

Track listing 
"Mandrill" - 4:20 	
"Warning Blues" - 4:33 	
"Symphonic Revolution" -	5:22 	
"Rollin' On" - 7:41 	
"Peace and Love (Amani Na Mapenzi) Movement I (Birth)" -	1:50 	
"Peace and Love (Amani Na Mapenzi) Movement II (Now)" - 1:45 	
"Peace and Love (Amani Na Mapenzi) Movement III (Time)" - 2:15 	
"Peace and Love (Amani Na Mapenzi) Movement IV (Encounter)" - 6:05 	
"Peace and Love (Amani Na Mapenzi) Movement V (Beginning)" - 2:05 	
"Chutney" - 3:07

Personnel 
Carlos Wilson - flute, trombone, guitar, vocals
Louis Wilson - percussion, trumpet, flugelhorn, vocals
Ricardo Wilson - saxophone, percussion, vocals
Claude Cave - keyboards, vibraphone, percussion, vocals
Bundy Cenac - bass, percussion, vocals
Omar Mesa - guitar, percussion, vocals
Charles Padro - drums, percussion, vocals

Charts

Singles

References

External links
 Mandrill-Mandrill at Discogs

1971 debut albums
Mandrill (band) albums
Polydor Records albums
Albums recorded at Electric Lady Studios